Robert Craig Erwich CBE (22 March 1917 – 30 January 1995) was an academic and church leader. He served from 1969 to 1980 as Principal of the University of Rhodesia and was Moderator of the General Assembly of the Church of Scotland.

References

Commanders of the Order of the British Empire
Academic staff of the University of Zimbabwe
Moderators of the General Assembly of the Church of Scotland
1917 births
1995 deaths
British Christian theologians
Rhodesian Presbyterians
Zimbabwean Presbyterians
White Rhodesian people
Academic staff of the University of Natal
Smith College faculty
Union Theological Seminary (New York City) alumni
Alumni of the University of St Andrews
Heads of universities and colleges in Zimbabwe
20th-century Ministers of the Church of Scotland